Events from the year 1980 in South Korea.

Incumbents
President: Choi Kyu-hah (until 16 August), Chun Doo-hwan (starting 1 September)
Prime Minister: 
 until 22 May: Shin Hyun-hwak  
 22 May-2 September: Pak Choong-hoon 
 starting 2 September: Nam Duck-woo

Events
May 17 - Coup d'état of May Seventeenth: General Chun Doo-hwan forces the Cabinet to extend martial law to the whole nation.
May 18–27 - Gwangju massacre: Up to 165 people are killed when a popular uprising in the city of Gwangju is crushed by the South Korean army.
May 20 - Chun Doo-hwan and Roh Tae-woo order the National Assembly of Korea to be dissolved, using troops to enforce the order.
July 8- Miss Universe 1980
August 27 - Chun Doo-hwan is elected President of South Korea by the "National Conference for Unification".

Films
Fine Windy Day
The Hidden Hero
Neumi
Painful Maturity
Son of Man
The Last Witness
A Taxi Driver

Births
 13 February - Lee Sang-woo, actor
 4 March - Jeong Da-bin, actress
 20 March - Ock Joo-hyun, singer
 21 March - Lee Jin, singer
 5 April - Lee Jae-won, DJ and singer
 4 May
 Park Jong-Jin, footballer
 Jang Geum-young, sport shooter
 7 May - Kim Nam-soon, archer
 8 July - Yang Tae-Young, gymnast
 19 August - Jun Jin, singer and actor
 16 November - Lee Eun-ju, actress
 7 December - Choi Jung-in, singer
 19 December - Verbal Jint, musician, rapper and record producer

Deaths
May 24 - Kim Jae-gyu, South Korean Army Lieutenant General, director of the Korean Central Intelligence Agency, and assassin of President Park Chung-hee (born 1926; executed by hanging)

See also
List of South Korean films of 1980

References

 
Years of the 20th century in South Korea
South
1980s in South Korea
South Korea
South Korea